Theodoros "Akis" Chatziantoniou (born ) is a former Greek male volleyball player. He was part of the Greece men's national volleyball team. He competed with the national team at the 2004 Summer Olympics in Athens, Greece.

Clubs
  Panathinaikos (1994)
  Olympiacos (2004-2008)
  Panathinaikos (2008-2010)

See also
 Greece at the 2004 Summer Olympics

References

External links
 profile, club career, info at greekvolley.gr (in Greek)

1974 births
Living people
Greek men's volleyball players
Volleyball players from Thessaloniki
Volleyball players at the 2004 Summer Olympics
Olympic volleyball players of Greece
Olympiacos S.C. players
Iraklis V.C. players
Panathinaikos V.C. players